Ocean Gate School District is a community public school district that serves students in pre-kindergarten through sixth grade from Ocean Gate in Ocean County, New Jersey, United States.

As of the 2018–19 school year, the district, comprising one school, had an enrollment of 142 students and 15.4 classroom teachers (on an FTE basis), for a student–teacher ratio of 9.2:1. In the 2016–17 school year, Ocean Gate was tied as having the 26th smallest enrollment of any school district in the state, with 149 students.

The district is classified by the New Jersey Department of Education as being in District Factor Group "B", the second-lowest of eight groupings. District Factor Groups organize districts statewide to allow comparison by common socioeconomic characteristics of the local districts. From lowest socioeconomic status to highest, the categories are A, B, CD, DE, FG, GH, I and J.

Public school students in seventh through twelfth grades attend the schools of the Central Regional School District, which serves students from Ocean Gate and from the municipalities of Berkeley Township, Island Heights, Seaside Heights and Seaside Park. Schools in the high school district (with 2018–19 enrollment data from the National Center for Education Statistics) are 
Central Regional Middle School with 769 students in grades 7–8 and 
Central Regional High School with 1,483 students in grades 9–12. The high school district's board of education consists of nine members, who are directly elected by the residents of the constituent municipalities to three-year terms of office on a staggered basis, with three seats up for election each year. Ocean Gate is allocated one of the board's nine seats.

Schools
Ocean Gate Elementary School had an enrollment of 142 students in grades PreK-6 as of the 2018–19 school year.

Administration
Core members of the district's administration are:
Melanie Patterson, Superintendent
John Failla, Business Administrator / Board Secretary

Board of education
The district's board of education, with five members, sets policy and oversees the fiscal and educational operation of the district through its administration. As a Type II school district, the board's trustees are elected directly by voters to serve three-year terms of office on a staggered basis, with either one or two seats up for election each year held (since 2012) as part of the November general election.

References

External links
Ocean Gate Elementary School

School Data for the Ocean Gate Elementary School, National Center for Education Statistics
Central Regional School District

Ocean Gate, New Jersey
New Jersey District Factor Group B
School districts in Ocean County, New Jersey
Public elementary schools in New Jersey